Hayley Mary is an Australian singer-songwriter and was the lead singer of The Jezabels from 2007–2017. Mary released her debut solo single in 2020.

Early life
Hayley Mary grew up in Byron Bay where she went to school with Heather Shannon, with whom she would later form The Jezabels. The two relocated to Sydney to attend University, where they met Nik Kaloper and Sam Lockwood, and formed the band in 2007.

Career

2007–2017: The Jezabels

The Jezabels were formed in 2007 when the four members met as students at the University of Sydney and over the next years released three EPs and three studio albums, all of which peaked within the ARIA top 5 and three extended plays. The band won an ARIA Music Award, an Australian Music Prize and three Australian Independent Record Awards.

The band have been on unofficial hiatus since December 2017.

2018–present: Solo career
On 14 October 2019, Mary released her debut solo single "The Piss, The Perfume". This was followed by "Ordinary Me" in December 2019. On 8 January 2020, "Like a Woman Should" was released, all from Mary's debut EP, The Piss, The Perfume on 17 January 2020.

In May 2021, Mary released "Young & Stupid", alongside announcement of her second EP The Drip, released on 18 June 2021.

On 26 November 2021, Mary surprise released her third EP titled Fall in Love.

Discography

Extended plays

Singles

Awards and nominations

AIR Awards
The Australian Independent Record Awards (known colloquially as the AIR Awards) is an annual awards night to recognise, promote and celebrate the success of Australia's Independent Music sector.

! 
|-
| 2021
| Herself
| Breakthrough Independent Artist of the Year
| 
| 
|-
| 2022
| The Drip
| Best Independent Rock Album or EP
| 
|

APRA Awards
The APRA Awards are presented annually from 1982 by the Australasian Performing Right Association (APRA), "honouring composers and songwriters".

! 
|-
| 2011
| Hayley McGlone  (with Nikolas Kaloper, Samuel Lockwood, Heather Shannon)
| Breakthrough Songwriter of the Year
| 
| 
|-

References

21st-century Australian women singers
21st-century Australian singers
Australian women singer-songwriters
Living people
Year of birth missing (living people)